The Knight-Moran House, near Franklin, Tennessee, was built in 1820.  Also known as Woodland, and denoted as WM-44.  It was listed on the National Register of Historic Places in 1988.

It is a double pen one-and-a-half-story log and frame house.  Its east wing was built c.1820 by Winfield Knight as a single pen log house with stone foundation and stone chimney.  A c.1840 log pen is joined by a breezeway.  It has a c.1860 addition with a c.1960 extension.  There are several interesting outbuildings.

References

Houses on the National Register of Historic Places in Tennessee
Houses completed in 1820
Houses in Franklin, Tennessee
National Register of Historic Places in Williamson County, Tennessee